Field service management (FSM) refers to the management of a company's resources employed at or en route to the property of clients, rather than on company property. Examples include locating vehicles, managing worker activity, scheduling and dispatching work, ensuring driver safety, and integrating the management of such activities with inventory, billing, accounting and other back-office systems. FSM most commonly refers to companies who need to manage installation, service, or repairs of systems or equipment. It can also refer to software and cloud-based platforms that aid in field service management.

Industry examples
Field service management is used to manage resources in several industries. 
 In telecommunications and cable industry, technicians who install cable or run phone lines into residences or business establishments. 
 In healthcare,  mobile nurses who provide in-home care for elderly or disabled.
 In gas utilities, engineers are dispatched to investigate and repair suspected leaks. 
 In heavy engineering, mining, industrial and manufacturing, technicians dispatched for preventative maintenance and repair.
 In property maintenance, including landscaping, irrigation, and home and office cleaning.
 In HVAC industry, technicians have the expertise and equipment to investigate units in residential, commercial, and industrial environments.
 In the Postal and Packaging industry, technicians find out the exact locations of the customers and deliver/receive the packages.

Requirements

Field service management must meet certain requirements: 
 Customer expectations: Customers expect that their service should not be disrupted, and should be immediately restored
 Underutilized equipment: Expensive industrial equipment in mining or oil and gas can cost millions when sitting idle 
 Low employee productivity: Managers are unable to monitor field employees, which may reduce productivity
 Safety: Safety of drivers and vehicles on the road and while on the job site is a concern both for individuals and their employers
 Cost: Rising cost of fuel, vehicle maintenance, and parts inventory
 Service to sales: Increasingly, companies expect their services department to generate revenues. 
 Dynamic environment: Continuously balancing between critical tickets, irate customers, productive employees, and optimized routes make scheduling, routing, and dispatching very challenging
 Data and technology: Many times, the data for analytics is missing, stale, or inaccurate.

Software

FSM software has significantly evolved in the past 10 years, however, the market for FSM software remains fragmented. The software can be deployed both on-premises or as a hosted or cloud-based system. Typically, FSM software is integrated with backend systems such as service management, billing, accounting, parts inventory, and other HR systems.

The large majority of FSM companies are fee-for-service and offer different features and functionality that vary from one company to the next. Whereas one company will provide most, if not all, of the desirable features in field service management, another will be missing one or up to several functions. Pricing is dependent on several factors: a company's size, business needs,  number of users, carrier selection, and planned data usage. Some popular fee structures are pay-per-franchise, pay-per-use/administrators, and pay-per-field technician/employee. Costs can range from $20.00 per month for an unbundled solution that does not include carrier data charges to upwards of $200.00. It is not uncommon, although not always the case, for there to be other fees incurred with the use of the FSM platform; namely, fees for software, extra technical support, and additional training.

For the enterprise market, Gartner estimates that market penetration for field service applications has reached 25% of the addressable market. Software sales in the FSM market can only be approximated. Gartner's research puts the revenue for packaged field service dispatch and workforce management software applications, not including service revenue, at approximately $1.2 billion in 2012, with a compound annual growth rate of 12.7%.

Mobility

Companies are using mobile computing to improve communication with the field, increase productivity, streamline work processes, and enhance customer service and loyalty. Field service software can be used  for scheduling and routing optimization, automated vehicle location, remote vehicle diagnostics, driver logs and hours-of-service tracking, inventory management, field worker management and driver safety.  Mobile software may use databases containing details about customer-premises equipment, access requirements, and parts inventory. Some field service management software integrates with other software such as accounting programs.

Mobility can
 Provide real-time analysis of mobile work status
 Increase the first-time-fix rate
 Reduce overhead or administration costs of paper-based field service management and data entry
 Preserve e-audit trail for full regulatory compliance
 Increase productivity
 Shorten billing cycles

See also
 Enterprise asset management
 CMMS
 Computer-assisted dispatch
 Field force automation
 Mobile enterprise application framework
 Service chain optimization
 Service management
 Strategic service management
 Workforce management

References

Management by type
Information systems